Air Vice Marshal Muhammad Ghulam Tawab (1 July 1930 – 23 February 1999) was the second chief of the air staff of Bangladesh Air Force who also served as deputy chief martial law administrator of Bangladesh with General Ziaur Rahman and Admiral M. H. Khan from 1975 to 1976.

Early life
Tawab was born in a village near Sylhet, of Bengal Province, British Indian Empire, on 1 July 1930. He was married to Henrietta, a German national, and has two sons and a daughter.

Career 
After graduating college Tawab joined the Pakistan Air Force in 1951 and was commissioned with the 9th GD(P) course as a pilot officer in the Pakistan Air Force. He graduated from PAF College Risalpur on September 15, 1951. In 1975, Tawab was promoted to Air Vice Marshal and appointed as Chief of Air Staff of Bangladesh Air Force.

After Sheikh Mujib's assassination in August 1975, Tawab was immediately recalled from West Germany to active duty by Major Shariful Haque Dalim upon then Wing Commander M. Hamidullah Khan's advice. Air Vice Marshal A. K. Khandker was promptly dismissed, and Tawab was reinstated to Bangladesh Air Force and appointed the Chief of Air Staff with the rank of Air Vice Marshal. 

The Bengal Lancers were directly involved in the coup and killing of Sheikh Mujibur Rahman. They were posted to Bogra Cantonment and their officers were sent into diplomatic posting outside of Bangladesh. Major General Ziaur Rahman, chief of Bangladesh Army, had difficulty moving the Bengal Lancers to Bogra but was forced after Air Vice Marshall Muhammad Ghulam Tawab, Chief of Bangladesh Air Force, threat to use Air Force aircraft against the Bengal Lancers.

Air Vice Marshall Muhammad Ghulam Tawab addressed a rally of Bangladesh Jamaat-e-Islami calling for Bangladesh to be changed from a secular state to an Islamic one. The next month Tawab supports the return of four army officers involved in the assassination of Sheikh Mujibur Rahman and join the Bengal Lancers in Bogra Cantonment. The led to the 1976 Bogra mutiny under Syed Faruque Rahman, one of officers Tawab helped return to Bangladesh.

After the failed mutiny, Major General Ziaur Rahman retires Tawab, sends the four officers back, and disbands the Bengal Lancers.

M. G. Tawab retired from Bangladesh Air Force in 1977 and returned to West Germany. He died in Munich on 23 February 1999 from prostate cancer after several years of illness.

Awards & Decorations

References

|-

Bangladesh Air Force air marshals
Chiefs of Air Staff (Bangladesh)
1930 births
1999 deaths
People from Sylhet Division
20th-century Bengalis
German people of Bangladeshi descent